This is an index of lists of molecules (i.e. by year, number of atoms, etc.). Millions of molecules have existed in the universe since before the formation of Earth. Three of them, carbon dioxide, water and oxygen were necessary for the growth of life. Although humanity had always been surrounded by these substances, it has not always known what they were composed of.

By century

The following is an index of list of molecules organized by time of discovery of their molecular formula or their specific molecule in case of isomers:

By number of carbon atoms in the molecule 

 List of compounds with carbon number 1
 List of compounds with carbon number 2
 List of compounds with carbon number 3
 List of compounds with carbon number 4
 List of compounds with carbon number 5
 List of compounds with carbon number 6
 List of compounds with carbon number 7
 List of compounds with carbon number 8
 List of compounds with carbon number 9
 List of compounds with carbon number 10
 List of compounds with carbon number 11
 List of compounds with carbon number 12
 List of compounds with carbon number 13
 List of compounds with carbon number 14
 List of compounds with carbon number 15
 List of compounds with carbon number 16
 List of compounds with carbon number 17
 List of compounds with carbon number 18
 List of compounds with carbon number 19
 List of compounds with carbon number 20
 List of compounds with carbon number 21
 List of compounds with carbon number 22
 List of compounds with carbon number 23
 List of compounds with carbon number 24
List of compounds with carbon numbers 25-29
List of compounds with carbon numbers 30-39
List of compounds with carbon numbers 40-49
List of compounds with carbon numbers 50+

Other lists 

List of interstellar and circumstellar molecules
List of gases
List of molecules with unusual names

See also 
 Molecule
 Empirical formula
 Chemical formula
 Chemical structure
 Chemical compound
 Chemical bond
 Coordination complex
 List of chemical elements
 List of drugs by year of discovery
 List of interstellar and circumstellar molecules
 Timeline of chemical element discoveries
 Diatomic molecule
 Atomic model
 History of molecular theory

References

History of chemistry
Chemistry-related lists
Molecular formulas